Mornington is a suburb of Wellington, New Zealand, on the southern hills behind Brooklyn. It is named after the Duke of Wellington's father, the Earl of Mornington. The original Mornington is in County Meath, and was the Irish seat of the Duke's father. It was named in 1878 from the time when J.F.E. Wright (1827-1891) subdivided his land in the south-west of the city in partnership with Jacob Joseph, and created the suburbs of Mornington and Vogeltown.

Demographics 

Kingston-Mornington-Vogeltown had a population of 3,165 at the 2018 New Zealand census, an increase of 237 people (8.1%) since the 2013 census, and an increase of 276 people (9.6%) since the 2006 census. There were 1,221 households. There were 1,569 males and 1,596 females, giving a sex ratio of 0.98 males per female. The median age was 35.3 years (compared with 37.4 years nationally), with 585 people (18.5%) aged under 15 years, 666 (21.0%) aged 15 to 29, 1,626 (51.4%) aged 30 to 64, and 288 (9.1%) aged 65 or older.

Ethnicities were 76.3% European/Pākehā, 7.9% Māori, 4.5% Pacific peoples, 17.7% Asian, and 4.5% other ethnicities (totals add to more than 100% since people could identify with multiple ethnicities).

The proportion of people born overseas was 30.9%, compared with 27.1% nationally.

Although some people objected to giving their religion, 55.0% had no religion, 27.1% were Christian, 4.8% were Hindu, 1.1% were Muslim, 2.0% were Buddhist and 4.0% had other religions.

Of those at least 15 years old, 1,215 (47.1%) people had a bachelor or higher degree, and 207 (8.0%) people had no formal qualifications. The median income was $45,900, compared with $31,800 nationally. The employment status of those at least 15 was that 1,623 (62.9%) people were employed full-time, 318 (12.3%) were part-time, and 99 (3.8%) were unemployed.

Education

References

Suburbs of Wellington City